The UT Health San Antonio School of Dentistry, Formally known as Dental School at the University of Texas Health Science Center at San Antonio, often abbreviated UTHSCSA-Dental, is one of three dental schools in the state of Texas. It is located on the main campus of University of Texas Health Science Center at San Antonio in San Antonio, Texas.

Although a relatively young school in the country, the institute has managed to climb to renowned status in a very short time. In the last ranking of U.S. News & World Report which was published in 1996, the school was ranked at #1.

Each year, over 90 students graduate from the DDS program at the UTHSCSA.

Education
With nearly 200 dedicated research faculty members in 10 fields of study, the school offers various degrees, including dual doctorates.

Areas of focus are:
 Community Dentistry
Comprehensive Dentistry
 Dental diagnostic science
 Endodontics
 General dentistry
 Oral and maxillofacial surgery
 Orthodontics
 Pediatric dentistry
 Periodontics
 Prosthodontics
 Restorative dentistry

Research and publication
The Dental School at the Health Science Center ranked fourth in publications and 11th in scientific impact among the world's 760 dental schools from 1998 to 2002.

Faculty in this school developed the first digital panoramic x-ray device in America.

See also

American Student Dental Association

References

External links
 Official website of the Dental School at UTHSCSA

University of Texas Health Science Center at San Antonio
Educational institutions established in 1970
Dental schools in Texas
1970 establishments in Texas